Marcus Rediker (born October 14, 1951 in Owensboro, Kentucky) is an American professor, historian, writer, and activist for a variety of peace and social justice causes. He graduated with a B.A. from Virginia Commonwealth University in 1976 and attended the University of Pennsylvania for graduate study, earning an M.A. and Ph.D. in history. He taught at Georgetown University from 1982 to 1994, lived in Moscow for a year (1984-5), and is currently Distinguished Professor of Atlantic History of the Department of History at the University of Pittsburgh.

Scholarship
Rediker has written several books on Atlantic social, labor, and maritime history.  Informed by the Marxist critique of capitalism, they explore their respective subjects in systemic terms while emphasizing human class-consciousness and agency.  In the introduction to Between the Devil and the Deep Blue Sea, for example, he explains:

Rediker's approach can yield surprising discoveries and perspectives—like the egalitarianism of some pirate crews. "Pirates used the precapitalist share system to apportion their take," he argues in Villains of All Nations:

His most recent scholarship has turned to the related topics of the transatlantic slave trade and slave uprisings.

Awards
Rediker has won a number of awards for his works such as the George Washington Book Prize (2008), OAH Merle Curti Award (2008), National Endowment for the Humanities Fellow (2005–2006), American Council of Learned Societies Fellow (2005–2006) Distinguished Lecturer, OAH (2002–08), International Labor History Book Prize (2001), OAH Merle Curti Social History Book Award (1988) and ASA John Hope Franklin Book Prize (1988)

Selected publications
Between the Devil and the Deep Blue Sea: Merchant Seamen, Pirates, and the Anglo-American Maritime World, 1700–1750 (1987)
Who Built America? Working People and the Nation’s Economy, Politics, Culture, and Society, Volume 1 (1989)
 with Peter Linebaugh: The Many-Headed Hydra: Sailors, Slaves, Commoners, and the Hidden History of the Revolutionary Atlantic (2000)
Villains of All Nations: Atlantic Pirates in the Golden Age (2004)
 editor with Emma Christopher and Cassandra Pybus: Many Middle Passages: Forced Migration and the Making of the Modern World (2007)
The Slave Ship: A Human History (2007)
The Amistad Rebellion: An Atlantic Odyssey of Slavery and Freedom (2012)
The Fearless Benjamin Lay: The Quaker Dwarf Who Became the First Revolutionary Abolitionist (2017)
Prophet Against Slavery (2022)

References

External links
 Video of a talk entitled The Real Pirates Of The Caribbean by Marcus Rediker for Bristol Radical History Group
 Marcus Rediker's website
 Interview with ReadySteadyBook
 Audio lecture "Atlantic Pirates in the Golden Age" by Marcus Rediker
 The Sea is Red: An Interview with Marcus Rediker Mute Magazine
 Marcus Rediker Credentials

Living people
1951 births
21st-century American historians
21st-century American male writers
University of Pittsburgh faculty
American male non-fiction writers